Ahmed Ibrahim Helal (Arabic:أحمد إبراهيم هلال) (born 30 June 1993) is an Emirati footballer who plays for Dibba as a midfielder.

References

External links
 

Emirati footballers
1993 births
Living people
Dibba FC players
Al Urooba Club players
UAE First Division League players
UAE Pro League players
Association football midfielders